Lana Morris, born Avril Maureen Anita Morris (11 March 1930 – 28 May 1998) was a British film, stage and television actress during the 1950s and 1960s.

She played the role of Helene Hillmer in the 1967 BBC adaptation of The Forsyte Saga, and appeared in many other television programmes. She worked with Roger Moore in The Saint, appearing on the cover of an early 1960s tie-in reprinting of the novel The Saint in New York. She later became a television panellist. She was also in British films such as I Start Counting.

She was married to the BBC executive Ronnie Waldman (1914–1978).

She died of a heart attack in Windsor, Berkshire, having been taken ill shortly after the first performance of the Barbara Taylor Bradford adaptation Dangerous to Know at the Theatre Royal, Windsor, aged 68.

Filmography

Film

Television

References

External links

People from Ruislip
English film actresses
English television actresses
20th-century English actresses
1930 births
1998 deaths